The Pennsylvania Fish and Boat Commission is an independent state agency responsible for the regulation of all fishing and boating in the state of Pennsylvania within the United States of America.  Unlike many U.S. states, Pennsylvania has a separate Game Commission.

Its mission is: to protect, conserve, and enhance the Commonwealth's aquatic resources and provide fishing and boating opportunities.

Created by law signed on March 23, 1866 by Governor Andrew Curtin, its original main purpose was to restore fish migrations of American shad within the rivers. Today, its scope manages boat launches, waterways, fish hatcheries, and other properties used for recreational fishing and boating.  It also regulates the accessibility through dams on major waterways via fish ladders. Ten members make up the Board of Commissioners who oversee all operations, serving 8-year terms without pay. Among others, the Commission employs waterway conservation officers and biologists, while also utilizing volunteer deputy conservation officers and volunteer instructors to serve the public. The conservation officers are assigned to various districts across the Commonwealth, where—in addition to fish and boat law enforcement—they conduct boating and fishing schools, fish stocking, public relations work, and investigate water pollution violations.

The Commission's first fishing license was issued in 1922, and they have been continually issued annually since; in 2007, they were converted to the Point of Sale computerized system.  These licenses are valid on December 1 of the preceding year until December 31 of the license year.  They also issue boat registrations, which are for a two-year period, expiring on March 31 of the year of expiration. Because the agency is a Commission, funds from purchasing licenses directly benefits the protection and conservation of aquatic resources; it is not supported by general fund state-tax money. However, the Commission does receive a portion of federal excise taxes through sporting goods and marine fuel taxation.

Law enforcement
Fishing and boating regulations are enforced by Waterways Conservation Officers. WCOs are employed by the Fish and Boating Commission and are police officers certified by the Pennsylvania State Police Municipal Police Officers Training Standards. Officers patrol on foot, in vehicles and on boats, and are certified boating safety instructors. Training consists of 26 weeks basic police officer training, followed by a further 26 weeks specialist training for the role.

See also
 List of law enforcement agencies in Pennsylvania
 List of Pennsylvania state agencies
 Pennsylvania Natural Heritage Program

External links
Pennsylvania Fish & Boat Commission homepage
Mission statement of the PFBC
PFBC page to purchase fishing licenses
Summary of Pennsylvania fishing regulations
PFBC page to register or title a boat
Summary of Pennsylvania boating regulations

References

Government of Pennsylvania
State agencies of Pennsylvania
Government agencies established in 1866
1866 establishments in Pennsylvania
State law enforcement agencies of Pennsylvania
State wildlife and natural resource agencies of the United States